S.S.C. Napoli returned to Serie A with a stable funding from Aurelio De Laurentiis and a couple of exciting new signings in Marek Hamšík and Ezequiel Lavezzi. With those two quality players in the squad, Napoli was a reliable force, finishing 8th in the standings. Another surprising performer was defensive general Maurizio Domizzi, who scored 11 goals in all competitions, becoming the club's tied top scorer with Lavezzi.

Squad

Serie A

Matches

Coppa Italia

Statistics

Top scorers
Includes all competitive matches. 
{| class="wikitable sortable" style="font-size: 95%; text-align: center;"
|-
!width=15|
!width=15|
!width=15|
!width=150|Name
!width=80|Serie A
!width=80|Coppa Italia
!width=80|Total
|-
|1
|FW
|
|Ezequiel Lavezzi
|8
|3
|11
|-
|=
|DF
|
|Maurizio Domizzi
|8
|3
|11
|-
|2
|MF
|
|Marek Hamšík
|9
|1
|10
|-
|3
|FW
|
|Marcelo Zalayeta
|8
|0
|8
|-
|4
|FW
|
|Roberto Sosa
|6
|0
|6
|-
|5
|MF
|
|Mariano Bogliacino
|3
|0
|3
|-
|=
|FW
|
|Emanuele Calaiò
|2
|1
|3
|-
|6
|MF
|
|Walter Gargano
|2
|0
|2
|-
|7
|FW
|
|Roberto De Zerbi
|0
|1
|1
|-
|=
|MF
|
|Daniele Mannini
|1
|0
|1
|-
|=
|MF
|
|Samuele Dalla Bona
|0
|1
|1
|-
|=
|DF
|
|Paolo Cannavaro
|1
|0
|1
|-
|=
|DF
|
|Matteo Contini
|1
|0
|1
|-
|=
|DF
|
|György Garics
|1
|0
|1
|-
|colspan="3"|
|TOTALS
|50
|13
|63
|-

Starting 11

References

Sources
RSSSF - Italy 2007/08

S.S.C. Napoli seasons
Napoli